Bernhard or Bernard(us) of Hildesheim (died 20 July 1154) was Bishop of Hildesheim from 1130 until 1153 (resigned). He achieved the canonization of Gotthard of Hildesheim by Pope Innocent II and founded the basilica St. Godehard in honour of the new Saint at Hildesheim, where he was buried. He is venerated Blessed in the Roman Catholic Church.

Roman Catholic bishops of Hildesheim
German beatified people
12th-century German Roman Catholic bishops
1154 deaths
Year of birth unknown